Kabhi Alvida Naa Kehna, also abbreviated as KANK, is a 2006 Indian Hindi-language musical romantic drama film written and directed by Karan Johar and produced by his mother Hiroo Yash Johar, in her debut, under the Dharma Productions banner. The film stars Amitabh Bachchan, Shah Rukh Khan, Abhishek Bachchan, Rani Mukherji, Preity Zinta and Kirron Kher. Set and mostly taking place in New York City, the film explores themes of marital infidelity and dysfunctional relationships. The film was promoted with the tag-line "A Love... That Broke All Relationships".

Kabhi Alvida Naa Kehna released worldwide on 11 August 2006 to mixed reviews from critics, with varied responses to its subject matter and direction. It was a commercial success in India, becoming the fourth-highest grossing Bollywood film of 2006. Additionally, it was also a major commercial success internationally, especially in the United States. It became the highest grossing Indian film of all time overseas at the time of its release. The film was screened in over 1,200 cinemas worldwide, grossing a worldwide total of ₹1.13 billion. It was screened at the Tokyo International Film Festival.

Plot 
In 2002, Maya is an orphan who is to marry her closest childhood friend, Rishi Talwar. The two have been raised by Rishi's fun-loving wealthy father, Samarjit. Dev is a successful soccer player who lives in New York City with his wife Rhea, his son Arjun and his mother Kamaljit. Maya meets Dev moments before she is to marry Rishi. Although the two are strangers, they connect instantly. Right after they part, Dev is hit by a car and permanently injures his leg. As a result, he can no longer play soccer.

Four years later, in 2006, Dev, who now walks with a limp, is short-tempered and embittered because of his inability to play soccer; Rhea's successful career as a fashion magazine editor makes him feel inferior to her. Since he cannot play soccer anymore, Dev is now a soccer coach of a team of juniors including his own son. Meanwhile, Maya is struggling with her infertility and lack of love for Rishi, seeing him as childish. Dev and Maya meet again and Rhea and Rishi strike a professional relationship. Sam and Kamal, having lost their spouses, become friends to help one another through their loneliness. Dev and Maya decide to do the same; they become friends and try to give each other ideas to salvage their marriages, all of which comically fail.

Dev and Maya realise they have feelings for one another and not toward their partners. Rhea mentions that she has received a promotion and Dev goes into a rant, sneering that she is trying to show off. Rhea accuses Dev of being jealous of her professional success and makes him realise his failure of being a good husband and a good father because he cannot come out of his bitterness. At the same time, Rishi expresses his frustration at Maya's lack of affection and his resentment toward her inability to have children. Feeling worthless, Maya meets a disheartened Dev at the train station and the two confess that they have fallen in love with each other.

Dev and Maya begin an affair but feel guilty for playing with their spouses' feelings, as both Rhea and Rishi try their best to make their marriages work. Nevertheless, Dev and Maya give in and make love. They are later caught in an embrace by Sam and Kamal, who are shocked and upset that they have cheated despite both Rhea and Rishi trying to make it work. That night, Sam has a heart attack. On his deathbed, he advises Maya to leave Rishi as she is depriving both of them of happiness in life. After Sam's death, Dev and Maya decide they must end their relationship and go back to their spouses, but first, they must tell them the truth about their extramarital affair because neither of them will be able to move on in the shadow of lies. Shocked, Rhea and Rishi divorce their spouses. Dev and Maya lie to each other and say that everything is fine, believing they'll never meet again.

Three years later, in 2009, Dev and Maya have been living alone, both miserable. Rishi visits Maya and reveals that he has fallen in love again and is remarrying. He invites Maya and Rhea to his wedding. Rhea attends with her boss Jay, whom she is now dating. Rhea confronts Maya about the affair and reveals that she left Dev. However, as Rhea and Rishi have both moved on, they encourage Maya to get her love, Dev, revealing that he is about to leave for Toronto by train, for his new job. At the train station, Dev sees Maya but avoids her, believing she is still with Rishi. However, as the train pulls away, the two make eye contact. Seeing her tears, Dev pulls the emergency brake and returns, and the couple reunites.

Cast 
Amitabh Bachchan as Samarjit "Sam" Talwar, Rishi's father
Shah Rukh Khan as Dev Saran
Abhishek Bachchan as Rishi Talwar
Rani Mukherji as Maya Talwar
Preity Zinta as Rhea Saran
Kirron Kher as Kamaljit "Kamal" Saran, Dev's mother
Arjun Rampal as Jai Mehra, Rhea's boss 
Ahsaas Channa as Arjun Saran, Dev and Rhea's son
Kajol in a cameo appearance in the song "Rock 'N' Roll Soniye"
John Abraham in a cameo appearance as the DJ in the song "Where's The Party Tonight?"
Karan Johar in a cameo appearance as a train passenger
Ayan Mukerji in a cameo appearance as a train passenger in the song "Tumhi Dekho Naa"

Production 
Kabhi Alvida Naa Kehna is titled after a line from the song "Chalte Chalte Mere Yeh Geet Yaad Rakhna" from Chalte Chalte (1976). The film was directed and written by Karan Johar who collaborated with Shibani Bathija to write the screenplay, and the dialogues were penned by Niranjan Iyengar. Produced by Karan's mother Hiroo Yash Johar in her debut under Dharma Productions, the soundtrack was performed by the musical trio Shankar–Ehsaan–Loy with lyrics penned by Javed Akhtar. Farah Khan was brought in to organize the choreographical aspects of the film, with costume designer Manish Malhotra, production designer Sharmishta Roy and MAC Cosmetics all playing a major role in production.

Kajol was initially offered the role of Maya Talwar. When she refused, due to her prior commitments with Yash Raj Films's Fanaa (2006), the role was passed on to her cousin Rani Mukherji, who was supposed to play Preity Zinta's part. However, Kajol made a guest appearance in the song "Rock 'N' Roll Soniye".

John Abraham makes a guest appearance as a DJ in the song "Where's The Party Tonight?".

Riteish Deshmukh also had a guest appearance, but his scene was cut during the editing process.

Kabhi Alvida Naa Kehna is set in New York City, while many of the scenes were filmed in East Hartford and New Haven in Connecticut. The soccer game scene was filmed at Rentschler Field, the home of the UConn Huskies football team. In several scenes, a light 'UConn' can be seen on the field. The majority of the Grand Central Station scenes were filmed at New Haven's Union Station and Philadelphia's 30th Street Station.

In an interview, Johar stated that the filming for the song "Tumhi Dekho Naa" was done at multiple locations and ended up being extremely time-consuming. The "blue section" of the song was shot at Columbia University in Upper West Side, the "yellow section" was shot at Wall Street in Lower Manhattan, the "orange section" at Bear Mountain State Park, the "pink section" at St. Patrick's Cathedral in Midtown Manhattan, the "red section" at the Pier A Park in Hoboken, New Jersey, and the "green section" at the Union Station in New Haven. The red section was initially designed to take place in the rain. However, due to the low temperatures, the raindrops produced by the rain machines started freezing in mid-air. This posed a risk of physical harm to the actors. Consequently, the filmmakers decided to do away with the rain. However, they still wanted to make use of the 200 red umbrellas they had purchased for the sequence. Eventually, they decided to shoot the red section on a sunny day where the actors used the umbrellas to block out the sun. The shooting for the green section also ran into problems. 200 extras were hired for the section but only 15 showed up. Consequently, crew members present on the set wore the green costumes to take their place. Ayan Mukherji, who was an assistant director of the film, can be seen in a green sweater carrying a box in one of the frames.

The film was filmed over a 90-day shooting period in the United States, but a few scenes were shot on four large sets in Mumbai studios.

Mukherji suffered from a severe skin allergy during the filming in the US.

Like previous Karan Johar films – Kuch Kuch Hota Hai (1998), Kabhi Khushi Kabhie Gham... (2001) and Kal Ho Naa Ho (2003) – Kabhi Alvida Naa Kehna has a four-word title that starts with a "K".

Music 

The music and background score of Kabhi Alvida Naa Kehna was composed by Shankar–Ehsaan–Loy, while the lyrics were penned by Javed Akhtar. This is the second time that lyricist Javed Akhtar and the composers Shankar–Ehsaan–Loy have teamed up for a Dharma production. The trio also replaces Johar's usual collaborators Jatin–Lalit, who had composed for his previous films. The audio rights were acquired by Sony Music India, under Sony BMG, teaming up with Karan Johar, for the fourth time after Kuch Kuch Hota Hai, Kabhi Khushi Kabhie Gham... and Kal Ho Naa Ho.

The title song "Kabhi Alvida Naa Kehna" rendered by Sonu Nigam and Alka Yagnik is a tearjerker. "Mitwa", an evocative sufi rock ballad, marked the introduction of Pakistani singer Shafqat Amanat Ali into the Bollywood scene. "Where's The Party Tonight?" by Shaan, Vasundhara Das, Loy and Shankar Mahadevan is the club song picturized on Abhishek and Preity. Then follows "Tumhi Dekho Naa", a soft and romantic ballad, which again is sung by the Sonu Nigam – Alka Yagnik duo is picturized on Shahrukh and Rani. "Rock 'N' Roll Soniye", picturized on Amitabh, Abhishek and Preity is a 60's Rock 'N' Roll track, sung by Shankar Mahadevan, Shaan and Mahalakshmi Iyer. "Farewell Trance" is the trance version of the title track, which is a rarity in Bollywood. The album also has a remix for Mitwa – Revisted". The soundtrack ends with a sad version of the title track, again by the Sonu Nigam – Alka Yagnik duo, "Kabhi Alvida Naa Kehna – Sad Version" which speaks of destiny, meeting again in life and never saying goodbye. The trio took care to not make the album sound repetitive, especially since the overall genre of the soundtrack is similar to that of their previous chartbuster Kal Ho Naa Ho.

The soundtrack of Kabhi Alvida Naa Kehna was launched in the United Kingdom on 12 June 2006 and was officially released in India on 16 June 2006 along with a grand music launch at the 7th IIFA Awards in Dubai.

Track listing

Critical reception 
Joginder Tuteja of Bollywood Hungama dismissed the initial negative reaction and hype, saying "Much before the official release of the music album of KANK, rumour brigade has been having a field day in pulling down the album. Well, that's not something new as with every biggie comes its share of detractors. But on hearing the songs for yourself, you realize that is it NOTHING, but a rumour! The album is yet another fine product from the team that delivers the kind of path-breaking music expected from it." Sukanya Verma of Rediff called the album "a treat for the melody-starved."

Charts and sales 
The album opened at #1 and retained the top position in the music charts for 10 straight weeks, despite facing tough competition from musical hits like Gangster, Fanaa and Krrish. According to the figures from Box Office India, the album sold over 1,900,000 copies in India making it the second best-selling album of the year, marginally behind Dhoom 2.

Release 
Kabhi Alvida Naa Kehna's teaser trailer was released along with Fanaa, which released on 26 May 2006.

Kabhi Alvida Naa Kehna, with a multi-star cast, premiered on 11 August 2006 and was screened in over 1,200 cinemas worldwide.

According to the Internet Movie Database (IMDb), the Motion Picture Association of America (MPAA) originally gave the film an R rating because of language and some sexual content. It was re-rated PG-13 on appeal.

Kabhi Alvida Naa Kehna was one of India's possible nominations for the 2007 Academy Award for Best Foreign Film, with films such as Rang De Basanti, Krrish, Omkara and Lage Raho Munna Bhai also in the running. However, the country ultimately chose Rang De Basanti as its pick.

Reception

Critical reception 
Critic Taran Adarsh from indiafm.com described the subject matter as a delicate one which could have easily been disastrous and praised the way in which director Karan Johar boldly constructed the film, citing it as his finest work to date. Adarsh approved in particular of the script and the devices the director incorporated to contrast emotions between scenes, remarking that, "the screenplay balances the two extremes; light moments and dollops of emotions with amazing ease". The individual cast performances were also praised by Adarsh, who commented on the effectiveness of the casting and the interaction of the actors.

Rajeev Masand from IBNLive gave the film 4 out of 5 stars praising the screenplay and Johar's direction, saying "Few writers have such solid control over their screenplay as Karan Johar does. Few understand the intricacies of narrative as well as he does. Johar goes from highs to lows, from plateaus to peaks with the ease of a pro. He knows exactly how to turn a seemingly ordinary scene into something special with just that one line of dialogue, or that hint of background music."

Derek Elley of Variety also praised the diversity of emotions displayed by the cast, remarking that, "Scripter Shibani Bathija never lets her characters inhabit a secure emotional place for very long, and impediments to happiness come from their own weaknesses rather than social constraints or plot-generated misunderstandings". Elley noted Amitabh Bachchan's performance as an ageing lothario and praised Preity Zinta as "stepping far beyond her makeup".

However, Raja Sen of rediff.com was particularly critical of the film, also expressing dissatisfaction with its length. He remarked, "I feel older. A showing of Karan Johar's mammoth 22-reel Kabhi Alvida Naa Kehna has left me unbelievably exhausted. I walked out of the hall feeling my cheeks for stubble, wondering if my clothes are suddenly dated and my hair's turned grey. I've lost a sizable chunk of my life, and you will too." Unlike other critics, he identified flaws in the script and criticized the strength of characters saying "The characters are cardboard, the setting is glitzy, the songs are tiresome, and the story oscillates between high melodrama and slapstick hilarity, going nowhere. Rarely has a weak script relied so completely on pretty people with big names to carry every line through".

In the United States, the film received a number of positive reviews.

Critics such as Neil Genzlinger of the New York Times emphasized the larger-than-life nature of the film, remarking that, "It is full of big Bollywood stars and out-sized everything: the rainstorms are a little rainier than real life; the wind machines are cranked up an extra notch; the close-ups get closer and linger longer than usual; the coincidences that drive the plot are a little more numerous and unlikely than normal screenwriting allows". He praised the humor in the script and the director's comic timing in certain scenes such as the children's soccer match, the bed store, and at the ballet show.

Box office 
Kabhi Alvida Naa Kehna saw a record opening at many cities in India and generated  in the first week itself, although it is currently Johar's lowest-grossing film according to net collections, even if unadjusted for inflation. It emerged the highest grosser worldwide for an Indian film, surpassing Kabhi Khushi Kabhie Gham...'s five-year-old record.

It opened strongly in the United States and the United Kingdom with first weekend grosses of $1.3 million in the U.S and $1.4 million (£750,000) in the UK.

In total, Kabhi Alvida Naa Kehna collected US$3,275,444 in the United States while in UK it netted over £5,079,688.00. In the US, one factor contributing to its success was the fact it debuted in 64 theatres, unusually high for a Bollywood film in cities with lower Indian populations such as Miami, Tampa, and Raleigh as well.

Kabhi Alvida Naa Kehna's total worldwide gross was 1.13 billion.

Accolades

Notes

See also 

 List of highest-grossing Bollywood films
 List of films set in New York City

References

External links 
 Official Website: Kabhi Alvida Naa Kehna
 
 

2006 films
2006 romantic drama films
2000s Hindi-language films
Indian films set in New York City
Indian romantic drama films
Films about adultery in India
Films directed by Karan Johar
Films scored by Shankar–Ehsaan–Loy
Films distributed by Yash Raj Films